Brian John Harper is an Irish Anglican priest: he is the current Archdeacon of Clogher.

Harper was born in 1961, educated at the University of Liverpool and the Church of Ireland Theological College, and ordained in 1986. His first posts were curacies at Portadown and Drumglass. After this, he held incumbencies at Ballygawley, Mullavilly and Magheracross. His appointment as Archdeacon of Clogher was announced in December 2016.

References

1961 births
Living people
Archdeacons of Clogher
Alumni of the University of Liverpool
Alumni of the Church of Ireland Theological Institute